James Randell Hughes (born April 3, 1953) is a former American football safety who played six seasons in the National Football League (NFL) for the Dallas Cowboys.  He played college football at the University of Oklahoma and was drafted in the fourth round of the 1975 NFL Draft.

Early years
Hughes played football at Tulsa Memorial High School (wearing lucky #13 jersey), where he was chosen by the Tulsa World newspaper as the Prep Player of the Year, becoming the first defensive back to ever win the award.

In 1973, he earned the starting strong safety position for the University of Oklahoma and wore #19, leading the team in interceptions (5) and being named All-Big Eight.

In 1974 he played a key role against the University of Nebraska, when he intercepted three passes and had 11 tackles in a 28–14 victory. It was the team's second straight Big Eight championship, en route to an undefeated season and the National Championship. As a senior, he was named All-Big Eight, first-team All-American, National Football Foundation National Scholar-Athlete, GTE/CoSIDA Academic All-American and also played in the Senior Bowl.

He finished his career after being a part of three Big Eight Conference titles, one National Championship, finishing fourth in school history with 14 career interceptions and tying the record for passes broken up in a season with 12 (1974). In 1979, he was voted to the seventies All-Decade Big Eight Team and in 1995 to the All-Time Big Eight Team.

Professional career
Hughes was selected by the Dallas Cowboys in the fourth round of the 1975 NFL Draft. He was one of 12 rookies who made the team that year - hence the "Dirty Dozen" nickname for the Cowboys 1975 draft, that helped the team reach Super Bowl X. From the start, his skills earned him comparisons to Cowboys great Cliff Harris.

Super Bowl XII was arguably his best game as a professional, registering 5 tackles, an interception and two fumbles recoveries, while earning MVP consideration.

During his first four seasons, he played mostly as a nickelback and served as the backup to Harris and Charlie Waters. In 1976, he had a chance to start 2 games after Harris was injured, and in 1979, he started in place of Waters, who sat out the entire year with an injured knee. On December 8 1979, he dislocated his right shoulder playing against the Philadelphia Eagles, which became an injury that eventually would end his career.

In 1980 he was the likely replacement for the retired Harris at free safety, but he missed most of the year, after reinjuring his right shoulder during pre-season and it being operated on twice He was replaced in the starting lineup by Dennis Thurman.

In 1981 he was projected as a starter, but dislocated his right shoulder while playing against the Los Angeles Rams in pre-season. The injury would open the door for rookie Michael Downs to earn the free safety job and for Hughes decision to retire before the start of the regular season.

Although he played six seasons and recorded 9 interceptions with the Cowboys, his career never fully blossomed because of recurring shoulder injuries. He tied a team record with interceptions in 3 straight playoff games.

Personal life
Hughes' son, Hampton Hughes, played defensive back for Boston College.

References

External links
Catching Up With Randy Hughes
Oklahoma Sooners bio

1953 births
Living people
Sportspeople from Oklahoma City
American football safeties
Oklahoma Sooners football players
Dallas Cowboys players